David S. Laustsen (June 13, 1947 – January 6, 2023) was an American politician. He served as a Democratic member of the South Dakota House of Representatives and the South Dakota Senate.

Life and career 
Laustsen was born in Racine, Wisconsin. He attended Central High School in Aberdeen, South Dakota and Northwestern University.

In 1977, Laustsen was elected to the South Dakota House of Representatives, serving until 1984. In 1985, he was elected to the South Dakota Senate, resigning in 1987, when he was accepted to attend Temple Law School.

Laustsen died on January 6, 2023, at the age of 75 in Doylestown, Pennsylvania.

References 

1947 births
2023 deaths
Politicians from Racine, Wisconsin
Democratic Party members of the South Dakota House of Representatives
Democratic Party South Dakota state senators
20th-century American politicians
Northwestern University alumni
Temple University Beasley School of Law alumni